Hetacillin is a beta-lactam antibiotic that is part of the aminopenicillin family. It is a prodrug and has no antibacterial activity itself, but quickly splits off acetone in the human body to form ampicillin, which is active against a variety of bacteria.


Administration
Hetacillin can be administered orally. The potassium salt, hetacillin potassium, is administered by injection, either intravenously or intramuscularly. It is sold under the trade name Hetacin for intramammary injection in veterinary use.

Hetacillin was withdrawn from the market for human use when the discovery was made that it had no advantages over ampicillin.

Chemistry
Hetacillin is prepared from ampicillin and acetone.

As opposed to ampicillin, hetacillin is only marginally broken down by the bacterial enzyme beta-lactamase, at least in vitro.

References 

Penicillins
Prodrugs
Withdrawn drugs
Imidazolidinones